Cowboy Murray was a professional baseball pitcher in the Negro leagues. He played with the Baltimore Elite Giants in 1943.

References

External links
 and Seamheads

Baltimore Elite Giants players
Year of birth missing
Year of death missing
Baseball pitchers